The blackbelly lanternshark or lucifer shark, Etmopterus lucifer, is a shark of the family Etmopteridae, found around the world in tropical to temperate seas, at depths between 150 and 1,250 meters.  Its length is up to 47 centimeters. This species consumes mesopelagic cephalopods, fishes, and crustaceans.

Blackbelly lanternsharks are ovoviviparous. They exhibit bioluminescence.

In June 2018 the New Zealand Department of Conservation classified the blackbelly lanternshark as "Not Threatened" with the qualifiers "Data Poor" and "Secure Overseas" under the New Zealand Threat Classification System.

References

Etmopterus
Taxa named by David Starr Jordan
Taxa named by John Otterbein Snyder
Fish described in 1902